Antonio Juan García-Santesmases Martín-Tesorero (born 1954) is a Spanish political philosopher and politician.

Biography 
Born in 1954 in Madrid, son to a well-off family, he studied in the Colegio de Nuestra Señora del Recuerdo.

Graduated in university studies in Philosophy and Arts in 1975, since 1979 he worked as highschool teacher, meanwhile he was preparing his PhD thesis, titled Marxism and State, a work he presented in 1983. He took an active role in the Izquierda Socialista faction within the Spanish Socialist Workers' Party (PSOE), and was a member of the PSOE Federal Committee from 1984 to 1997.

He ran 10th in the PSOE list in Madrid for the 1996 general election, and was elected legislator. He served as member of the Congress of Deputies from 26 March 1996 to 18 January 2000.

He became a professor of Political philosophy at the National University of Distance Education (UNED).

Works 

Author
 
 

Editor

References

Bibliography 
 
 
 

Living people
1954 births
Members of the 6th Congress of Deputies (Spain)
Spanish Socialist Workers' Party politicians
Spanish philosophers
Academic staff of the National University of Distance Education
People from Madrid